Thomas Lourds is a book series by author Charles Brokaw, focusing on the title character of anthropologist and linguist Thomas Lourds.

Plot overview
The series follows Thomas Lourds as he is thrust into several situations concerning religious historical secrets centering on ancient artifacts.

Books
 The Atlantis Code, 2009
 The Lucifer Code, 2010
 The Temple Mount Code, 2011
 The Oracle Code, 2013

Reception
Critical reception for the Thomas Lourds series has been mixed, with Publishers Weekly saying that The Atlantis Code "will get few readers' pulses racing, especially since Brokaw relies more on shoot-outs and narrow escapes than plausible archeological details to carry his story along." Of  The Atlantis Code, Kirkus Reviews wrote "Despite the lumbering pace, by-the-numbers descriptions and a surfeit of chase scenes, Brokaw holds readers until the last stone is turned."

The Seattle PI praised The Lucifer Code, calling it "a fun rollercoaster ride".

Of The Temple Mount Code, Kirkus gave the novel a mixed review, saying it was "derivative but entertaining escapist fare". The Journal Star praised the book, calling it "a sophisticated Indiana Jones".

References

American adventure novels
Thriller novel series
American novel series